The Mid-American Conference Baseball Pitcher of the Year is an annual award given to the most outstanding baseball pitcher in the Mid-American Conference. The award was first given after the 1988 season. Kent State players have won the award twice as many times as players from any other school.

Winners

Winners by school 

Buffalo discontinued its baseball program after the 2017 season.
Marshall was a member from 1954 to 1969 and then again from 1997 until 2005.
Northern Illinois was a member from 1973 to 1986, then left until 1997.

References 

Mid-American Conference baseball
NCAA Division I baseball conference players of the year
Awards established in 1988